André Richard (born 18 April 1944) is a Swiss composer and conductor.

Life 
Born in Bern, Richard studied singing, music theory and music composition first at the Conservatoire de musique de Genève and later at the Hochschule für Musik Freiburg with Klaus Huber and Brian Ferneyhough. This was followed by studies in live electronic music with Hans Peter Haller at the  Freiburg and at IRCAM in Paris. In the 1980s, he worked closely with Luigi Nono on performances of Prometeo, Caminantes..., Ayacucho and other works by the composer. In 1983, on the occasion of a performance of Luigi Nono's work The Breathing Clarity, he founded, together with Arturo Tamayo, the Freiburg Soloists' Choir, of which he has been the director since 1984. He made his conducting debut at the Warsaw Autumn in 1988 with the Polish premiere of Nono's Diario Polacco no 2, Quando stanno morendo. From December 1989 to December 2005, he was director of the experimental studio of the Heinrich Strobel Foundation of the Südwestrundfunk. With his studio, he has appeared internationally in numerous realisations of new works with integrated live-electronic means as interpreter and conductor.

Awards 
 1992 Reinhold-Schneider-Preis of the city of Freiburg
 1994 Prize of the Christoph and Stephan Kaske Foundation

Works 
 1983 Von aussen her… for violin and piano
 1985/86 Echanges for Ensemble and Live electronic music
 1987 Musique de rue Scenic music for ensemble and tape
 1989–1991 Glidif. a sonar e cantar for bass clarinet, double bass clarinet, 2 double basses and live electronics

References

External links 
 

Swiss conductors (music)
20th-century classical composers
1944 births
Living people
People from Bern
20th-century Swiss composers